Kim Gil-nam (born 29 August 1964) is a North Korean boxer. He competed in the men's light heavyweight event at the 1992 Summer Olympics.

References

1964 births
Living people
North Korean male boxers
Olympic boxers of North Korea
Boxers at the 1992 Summer Olympics
Place of birth missing (living people)
Light-heavyweight boxers